Popytka No. 5 (Russian: Попытка No. 5, Attempt No. 5) is the debut album by Nu Virgos.

Track listing

Vocals
Alena VinnitskayaNadezhda Granovskaya

Videos
2000 – Popytka No. 52000 – Obnimi menya2001 – Bomba2001 – Ya ne vernus

Certifications

External links
 Official Website

2001 debut albums
Nu Virgos albums